Guy Bates Post (September 22, 1875 – January 16, 1968) was an American character actor who appeared in at least 21 Broadway plays and 25 Hollywood films over a career that spanned more than 50 years. He was perhaps best remembered in the role of Omar Khayyám in the 1914 stage and 1922 film productions of Richard Walton Tully's Omar the Tentmaker and for his over 1,500 performances in John Hunter Booth's 1917 play The Masquerader.

Early life
Guy Bates Post was born in Seattle, Washington, the first of two sons and a daughter (actress Madeline Post) raised by John J. Post and Mary Annette Ostrander. His father, a Canadian of English descent, was a partner in the Seattle lumber firm Stetson and Post. His mother was born in Wisconsin into a family that originally went west from New York. Post received his education at schools in Seattle and later San Francisco, then he dropped out of college to embark on a career in theatre.

Stage

Post made his professional debut in November 1894 at Chicago's Schiller Theatre playing a minor role opposite Cora Urquhart Brown-Potter and Kyrle Bellew in Charlotte Corday. By May 1898, Post was a member of Otis Skinner's Company and married to Sarah Truax, the troupe's leading lady. His big break came early in 1900 when he was chosen to play David Brandon in Liebler and Company's Southern American tour of Israel Zangwill's The Children of the Ghetto.

Although the tour proved short lived, Post's performance in The Children of the Ghetto led to such rôles as Rawdon Crowley, in Langdon Miller's dramatization of the William Makepeace Thackeray novel  Vanity Fair;  Lieutenant Denton, in Augustus Thomas' Arizona; Robert Racket  in the Madeleine Lucette Ryley play My Lady Dainty; and Abbe Tiberge, in Theodore Burt Sayre's dramatization of the Abbé Prévost short novel Manon Lescaut.

Post remained active on Broadway until the mid-1930s achieving particular success as Captain Stuart in Soldiers of Fortune (1902)  by Augustus Thomas, Steve in The Virginian (1904) by Owen Wister and Kirke La Shelle, Dean in Bird of Paradise (1910) by Richard Walton Tully, Omar Khayyám in Omar the Tent Maker (1914) by Richard Walton Tully and dual rôles, as John Chilcote and John Loder, in The Masquerader (1914) by John Hunter Booth.

Film
Post had a 25-year career in cinema beginning in 1922 with silent film adaptations of Omar the Tentmaker and The Masquerader. He played the Grand Lama in the 1936 serial Ace Drummond and 'Papa' Bergelot in the 1937 serial The Mysterious Pilot. Post played Louis Napoleon in the 1937 film Maytime with John Barrymore, Jeanette MacDonald and Nelson Eddy. In 1939 he was once again cast as Louis Napoleon in the film The Mad Empress opposite Medea de Novara, Lionel Atwill and Conrad Nagel. In his last film, A Double Life (1947), Post plays an actor performing in a production of Shakespeare's Othello.

Personal life
Post married actress Sarah Truax on April 18, 1897, at St. John's Episcopal Church, San Francisco. At the time, the two were engaged with Skinner's company performing at the city's Baldwin Theatre. The couple divorced amicably some ten years later. In August 1907 he married Jane Peyton (born Jennie Van Norman), a fellow cast member with The Heir to the Hoorah tour.  This union ended with an annulment seven years later. Post married Adele Ritchie on February 2, 1916, at a ceremony held in Toronto two days after the actress had secured a divorce from her previous husband. Post and Ritchie separated in 1926 and divorced three years later. On October 26, 1936, in Las Vegas, Post married the British actress Lillian Kemble-Cooper. This union lasted for over 30 years and ended with his death in Los Angeles at the age of 92.

Filmography

Resources

External links

1875 births
1968 deaths
American male stage actors
American male film actors
American male silent film actors
19th-century American male actors
20th-century American male actors